Universidade Lusófona de Humanidades e Tecnologias (Lusophone University of Humanities and Technologies) is the largest Portuguese private university, and the main institution of Grupo Lusófona, which administers other universities and colleges in Portugal, Brazil, Cape Verde, Angola, Guinea-Bissau and Mozambique. Indeed, promotion of Lusophony (the speaking of Portuguese) is seen as a major objective of the institution; students from former Portuguese African colonies pay substantially reduced fees.

History

The Universidade Lusofona started in 1987 in Lisbon and is the property of Grupo Lusófona a Portuguese private investor group geared at developing higher education institutions in Lusophone countries. Since then Universidade Lusófona has opened semi-autonomous offshoots in Porto, Luanda, Mindelo (2007). The Instituto Superior Manuel Teixeira Gomes (ISMAT), is a private higher education establishment that belongs to the Lusófona Group, located in Portimão, Portugal, and founded as such in 2004 from older private higher education institutions previously operating in the city.

Courses offered

First Cycle of the Bologna process ("licenciatura" or undergraduate degree)

Department of Architecture, Urban Planning, Geography and Plastic Arts

 Architecture
 Geography and Development
 Urban Planning and Territorial Management

Department of Social and Human Sciences

 Political Science and International Relations
 Education Sciences
 Religious Sciences
 European Studies and International Relations
 Lusophone Studies
 Philosophy
 History
 Social Service
 Sociology
 Translation and Interpretation
 Tourism

Department of Communication Sciences, Architecture, Arts, and Information Technology

 Cinema, Video, and Multimedia Communication
 Communication and Culture Sciences
 Marketing, Advertising, and Public Relations
 Digital Animation
 Design
 Graphic Production and Design
 Photography
 Computer Engineering
 Communication and Arts
 Communication and Journalism
 Business Management Computing

Department of Health Sciences

 Pharmaceutical Sciences
 Health Unit Management

Department of Law

 Law

Department of Physical Education, Sports, and Leisure

 Physical Education and Sports

Department of Engineering and Natural Sciences

 Biology
 Ocean Sciences
 Chemistry
 Biotechnological Engineering
 Civil Engineering
 Environmental Engineering
 Electronic Engineering
 Industrial Management and Engineering
 Food Engineering
 Mathematics
 Biochemistry
 Biotechnology

Department of Veterinary Medicine

 Veterinary Medicine

Department of Psychology

 Psychology

Department of Economy and Management

 Accounting
 Economy
 Business Management
 Human Resources Management

Second Cycle of the Bologna process (master's degrees)

Department of Architecture, Urban Planning, Geography and Plastic Arts

 Advanced Studies in Architecture
 Geography and Development
 Museology
 Urban Planning

Department of Social and Human Sciences

 Education Scienceslll
 Political Science
 Science of Religions
 Special Education
 Literary Translation Studies
 Philosophy
 Social Service and Social Policy
 Sociology
 Lusophony and International Relations
 Political, Economic and Social Lusophone History
 Tourism

Department of Communication Sciences, Arts, and Information Technology

 Communication Sciences, Marketing, and Advertising
 Institutional Communication
 Alternative Communication and Support Systems
 Communication and Culture Sciences
 Film Studies
 Journalism, Politics, and Contemporary History
 Creation and Production in Technological Arts
 Multimedia Communication Systems
 Software Engineering and Information Systems
Kino Eyes - The European Movie Masters - Erasmus Mundus Joint Master
Docnomads - Erasmus Mundus Joint Master

Department of Health Sciences

 Dermatological and Cosmetic Sciences
 Pharmaceutical Sciences
 Pharmaceutical Care

Department of Law

 Law

Department of Physical Education, Sports, and Leisure

 Young Sportspeople Training
 Pedagogical Supervision in Physical Education and Sports

Department of Engineering and Natural Sciences

 Developmental Biology
 Engineering and Ocean Studies
 Environmental Engineering

Department of Veterinary Medicine

 Veterinary Medicine

Department of Psychology

 Education Psychology
 Psychology, Counselling and Psychotherapy
 Sexual Psychology
 Criminal Psychology and Social Exclusion
 Psychology in International and Inter-cultural environments

Department of Economy and Management

 Business Management
 Economy

Third Cycle of the Bologna process (doctor's degree)

Department of Architecture, Urban Planning, Geography and Plastic Arts

 Museology

Department of Social and Human Sciences

 Education
 Political Science
 Philosophy - Contemporary Thought

Department of Engineering and Natural Sciences

 Mathematics (Physics-Mathematics]

Department of Psychology

 Clinical Neuropsychology

Hazing Deaths
In December 2013, six students of the university drowned to death at Meco Beach in an alleged hazing (praxes in Portuguese) incident.

Instituto Superior Manuel Teixeira Gomes
The Instituto Superior Manuel Teixeira Gomes (ISMAT), is a private higher education establishment that belongs to the Lusófona Group, located in Portimão, Algarve region, Portugal, resulting from the merger between ISMAG and ISHT of Portimão in 2004. The main mission of the institute is to widen the offer of higher education in the western Algarve region. ISMAT's strategic objectives are to provide university courses and to develop research in the most different areas of specialization, with particular emphasis on scientific and technical fields that can contribute to the development of the Algarve region, that can respond to regional needs in terms of human resources training, and that can meet the most pressing regional development needs. The teaching institution was established in 2004 and is named after Manuel Teixeira Gomes, a Portuguese politician, diplomat and writer from Portimão who served as President of Portugal between 1923 and 1925. As of 2021, ISMAT awards degrees in fields such as architecture, data science, computer engineering, law, psychology and sports science. Besides research and teaching endeavors, the institution dynamizes the city's society through workshops and expositions it organizes. Among its teaching staff, ISMAT has counted with some notable individualities of the Algarve such as Cândida Ventura and Carlos Lopez Cano Vieira.

References

External links
Official site

Universidade Lusófona
Education in Porto
Education in Lisbon
1987 establishments in Portugal
Educational institutions established in 1987